Ricardo Martínez Matey (born 23 April 1964) is a Spanish former racing cyclist. He rode in the 1988 Tour de France.

Major results
1984
 1st Vuelta a Murcia
1986
 2nd Road race, National Road Championships

References

External links
 

1964 births
Living people
Spanish male cyclists
Cyclists from Barcelona